Casey Patrick Biggs (born April 4, 1955) is an American actor, best known throughout the Star Trek community for starring as the Cardassian Damar, on Star Trek: Deep Space Nine. He has appeared in over eighty film and television and stage productions.

Early life
Biggs was born on April 4, 1955, in Toledo, Ohio. When he was very young, he was a foster child. He decided to pursue acting when he was a student at Central Catholic High School and graduated in 1973. He received a BFA from Juilliard in 1977; studied acting at the Toledo Repertory Theatre.

Career
In January 1996, Biggs was in the made-for-TV movie A Promise to Carolyn. In 1996, he was nominated for the role of Damar in the science fiction show Star Trek: Deep Space Nine. Seemingly a minor character in his first appearance, Damar later became one of the major figures in the show, leading the entire Cardassian Union and having a major influence on the show's events. Biggs later returned to the Star Trek universe, making a guest appearance on Star Trek: Enterprise in the season 3 episode "Damage" as an Illyrian captain.

Biggs's other TV roles include the soap operas Ryan's Hope as Fenno Moore from 1988 to 1989, and General Hospital as Chad Wainwright in 1990. Another television role was on the 1990s TV series Stat. He has appeared in movies such as The Pelican Brief, Broken Arrow, Dragonfly and the Star Trek documentary Trekkies 2.

Biggs has made many guest appearances on TV shows, some of those appearances range from Father Dowling Mysteries, Matlock, The Young Riders, ER, Snoops, CSI: Miami, CSI: Crime Scene Investigation, Person of Interest and Crossing Jordan. In 2017 Biggs taught a class in directing and acting at The New School for Drama. Biggs appeared in the HBO docudrama Too Big To Fail on the financial crisis of 2007–2008 as Wells Fargo chairman Richard Kovacevich. In 2018, he returned to General Hospital as Dr. Lasaris.

Personal life
Biggs was married to Roxann Dawson from 1985 to 1987. Dawson later played B'Elanna Torres in Star Trek: Voyager. Their marriage ended before either of them were cast in Star Trek.

Select filmography

Film

Television

References

External links
 
 
 Interview with Casey Biggs & The Enterprise Blues Band on Slice of SciFi

1955 births
American male film actors
American male soap opera actors
American male television actors
Juilliard School alumni
Living people
Male actors from Toledo, Ohio
The New School faculty